Alexandra Duckworth (born November 11, 1987) is a Canadian snowboarder. She competes primarily in half-pipe and represented Canada in this event at the 2014 Winter Olympics in Sochi.

She officially retired from competitive snowboarding on December 1, 2015. Duckworth has been working as a philanthropist.  Her paternal grandmother is noted pacifist, feminist and social and community activist, Muriel Duckworth.

References

http://thechronicleherald.ca/sports/1325221-olympian-alexandra-duckworth-hangs-up-her-snowboard

1987 births
Living people
Alexandra
Canadian female snowboarders
Canadian philanthropists
Olympic snowboarders of Canada
People from Lunenburg County, Nova Scotia
Snowboarders at the 2014 Winter Olympics
Sportspeople from Nova Scotia